The PLAN assessment was a preliminary ACT test from ACT, Inc. that was generally administered in the sophomore year.

Components
The test consisted of four separate parts: an English (grammar) section, a Math section, a Reading section, and a Science section. Each portion of the test had a different number of questions and a different amount of time allotted.

Scoring
The PLAN test was scored between 1 and 32 and was determined by a composite scoring system much like that of the ACT, based on the scores received on each of the categories of the test.

References

External links
ACT's PLAN Assessment
ACT's PLAN Program
Using PLAN scores to predict ACT scores
Plan scores - National percentiles

Standardized tests in the United States